The 1470s BC was a decade lasting from January 1, 1479 BC to December 31, 1470 BC.

Events
 c. 1478 BC–1390 BC—Hand mirror, Eighteenth Dynasty of Egypt, is made. It is now at the Brooklyn Museum, New York.
 c. 1473 BC—Hatshepsut (18th Dynasty) started to rule. She is a daughter of Thutmose I. Married to her half brother Thutmose II.
 c. 1473 BC–1458 BC – Funerary temple of Hatshepsut, Deir el-Bahari is built. Eighteenth Dynasty of Egypt.
 c. 1473 BC–1458 BC—Hatshepsut as sphinx, from Deir el-Bahari was made. Eighteenth Dynasty of Egypt. It is now in the Metropolitan Museum of Art, New York.

Significant people
Thutmose III, Pharaoh of the Eighteenth Dynasty (1479 BC–1425 BC). He was the first who called himself "pharaoh"
Hatshepsut, female Pharaoh of the 18th Dynasty (1473 BC–1458 BC)

References